Grimsby Pier railway station was sited on the now demolished pier with the same name in Grimsby, England.

The station opened in 1853, but sources differ on when it closed. Dow is insistent that it closed in the 1870s and was converted into an Emigrants' Home, Butt supports this with a date of 1879 and Anderson gives 1880. Croughton claims it closed at the outbreak of the First World War, whilst a reply to an enquiry to The Railway Magazine implied the station closed at the outbreak of The Second World War. OS Maps corroborate the first three.

Boat trains undoubtedly continued to run to the quayside at Grimsby up to 1939, but a station, as such, at the pier was not needed. Passengers were assisted off trains and escorted direct to adjacent ships and vice versa, much as at Immingham Eastern Jetty.

As the conversion of the station to an Emigrants' Home suggests, the erstwhile Pier Station was used as transit accommodation for people making their way to the New World, typically arriving from Europe by ship then travelling via the GCR to Liverpool for final embarkation.

The station was accessed via a spur from Grimsby Docks station.

The substantial building survived until at least 1960 but by 2015 no trace remained.

Services
The station was used by Great Central Railway emigrant trains to Liverpool and boat trains across the North Sea, principally to Hamburg.

References

Sources

External links
 The former station on an 1888 OS map National Library of Scotland

Disused railway stations in the Borough of North East Lincolnshire
Former Great Central Railway stations
Railway stations in Great Britain opened in 1853
Railway stations in Great Britain closed in 1879